Henricus van de Wetering (26 November 1850 – 16 November 1929) was a Dutch Catholic archbishop.
 
Van de Wetering was appointed Titular Archbishop of Gaza and Coadjutor of the metropolitan see of Utrecht, on 8 February 1895. He was consecrated on 24 March 1895 at Hilversum, Church of Saint Vitus, by Caspar Josephus Bottemanne, Bishop of Haarlem. Five months later, upon the death of Archbishop Petrus Matthias Snickers, he succeeded him as Archbishop of Utrecht and Primate of the Netherlands, until his death in 1929.

Notes

References

1850 births
1929 deaths
19th-century Roman Catholic archbishops in the Netherlands
20th-century Roman Catholic archbishops in the Netherlands
Archbishops of Utrecht
People from Amersfoort
Dutch Roman Catholic archbishops